Jason Ruder is an American sound engineer. He was nominated for an Academy Award in the category Best Sound for the film A Star Is Born.

Selected filmography 
 A Star Is Born (2018; co-nominated with Tom Ozanich, Dean A. Zupancic and Steven A. Morrow)

References

External links 

Living people
Place of birth missing (living people)
Year of birth missing (living people)
American audio engineers
21st-century American engineers